Danny C. Carroll (born August 19, 1953) is an American politician in the state of Iowa.

Carroll was born in Colorado Springs, Colorado and attended Milligan College. A Republican, he served in the Iowa House of Representatives from 1995 to 2007 (58th district from 1995 to 2003 and 75th district from 2003 to 2007).

References

1953 births
Living people
Businesspeople from Colorado Springs, Colorado
Milligan University alumni
Republican Party members of the Iowa House of Representatives
Politicians from Colorado Springs, Colorado
State political party chairs of Iowa